This is a list of members of the States Assembly of Jersey.

Composition

Graphical representation 
These are graphical representations of the States Assembly showing a comparison of party strengths.

 Note this is not the official seating plan of the States Assembly.

Members 
This is a list of elected States Assembly members.

Connétables

Deputies

References

External links 
 States Assembly official website

Members of the States of Jersey
Lists of British people